Dalla mesoxantha is a species of butterfly in the family Hesperiidae. It is found in Venezuela, Ecuador and Peru.

References

Butterflies described in 1884
mesoxantha
Hesperiidae of South America